Killuminati 2K11 is a mixtape by American hip-hop group Outlawz hosted by DJ Smallz and DJ Kay Slay, released July 14, 2011 for free download.

Track listing

References

External links 
 
 
 
 
 
 

2011 mixtape albums
Albums produced by Maxwell Smart (record producer)
Outlawz albums
Sequel albums